Aaron Perry Taylor-Johnson (né Johnson; born 13 June 1990) is an English actor. He is best known for his portrayal of the title character in Kick-Ass (2010) and its 2013 sequel, and the Marvel Cinematic Universe character Pietro Maximoff in Avengers: Age of Ultron (2015). 

Taylor-Johnson began performing as a child and appeared in such films as Shanghai Knights (2003), The Illusionist (2006), and Angus, Thongs and Perfect Snogging (2008). He had his breakthrough performance as John Lennon in the biopic Nowhere Boy (2009), directed by Sam Taylor-Johnson, whom he married in 2012. He followed this with roles in the crime thriller Savages (2012), period drama Anna Karenina (2012), and monster film Godzilla (2014).

For his performance as a psychopathic drifter in the thriller film Nocturnal Animals (2016), Taylor-Johnson won the Golden Globe Award for Best Supporting Actor and was nominated for the BAFTA Award for Best Actor in a Supporting Role. He has since appeared in the action films Tenet (2020) and Bullet Train (2022).

Early life
Taylor-Johnson was born Aaron Perry Johnson in High Wycombe on 13 June 1990, the son of housewife Sarah and civil engineer Robert Johnson. He is Jewish, and has a sister named Gemma who later had a small role in his film Tom & Thomas (2002). He was educated at Holmer Green Senior School, and attended the Jackie Palmer Stage School in High Wycombe between 1996 and 2008, studying drama, tap, jazz, acrobatics, and singing.

Career

Johnson began acting at the age of six. On stage, he appeared in a London production of Shakespeare's Macbeth, playing the son of Macduff alongside Rufus Sewell, who played Macbeth, in 1999. He appeared in Arthur Miller's All My Sons in 2000. His television roles have included Niker in the 2004 BBC adaptation of the novel Feather Boy, Aaron in Danny Brocklehurst's ITV1 serial Talk to Me, and Owen Stephens in Nearly Famous. In 2003, Taylor-Johnson appeared as a young Charlie Chaplin in Shanghai Knights alongside Jackie Chan and Owen Wilson, with Chaplin depicted as a member of a London gang of street thugs. That year he also guest starred in a special live episode of ITV drama The Bill. In 2006, he appeared in The Illusionist, appearing in the early flashback scenes as Edward Norton's character, Eduard Abramovicz, as a teenager. The scenes show the young Eduard as he first learns magic, and to do this, Johnson had to learn how to perform the ball trick displayed by his character. He learned how to perform the balancing of the egg on the stick, although that was effected mechanically. Also in 2006, he starred in the film The Thief Lord, as Prosper.

Taylor-Johnson appeared as John Lennon in the 2009 biographical film Nowhere Boy, directed by Sam Taylor-Wood. His performance saw him receive the Empire Award for Best Newcomer and he was also nominated for Young British Performer of the Year by the London Film Critics' Circle. In 2010, Taylor-Johnson appeared as David "Dave" Lizewski/Kick-Ass, the lead character in Kick-Ass, based on the superhero comic book of the same name by Scottish writer Mark Millar. His performance in Kick-Ass saw him nominated for the BAFTA Rising Star Award. He has also appeared as the central character, William, in Hideo Nakata's Chatroom. In December 2010, Taylor-Johnson joined the cast of Albert Nobbs as a replacement for Orlando Bloom, who dropped out of the production due to his wife's pregnancy. Taylor-Johnson starred in R.E.M.'s 2011 music video "Überlin", which was also directed by his then-fiancée.

In 2012, Taylor-Johnson played Count Vronsky in Anna Karenina. Later that year, he starred as Ben in Oliver Stone's Savages. HitFix film critic Drew McWeeny was positive of the bond between Johnson and co-star Taylor Kitsch, which "seems not only credible but lived in and authentic throughout the film", and noted the evolution in maturity of Johnson since Kick-Ass. Taylor-Johnson starred in the Godzilla reboot, released in May 2014. Taylor-Johnson played Quicksilver in Avengers: Age of Ultron (2015), the sequel to 2012's The Avengers, as part of the Marvel Cinematic Universe. Taylor-Johnson first appeared as the character in a post-credits scene of the film Captain America: The Winter Soldier (2014). The role reunited him with Elizabeth Olsen, who played his wife in Godzilla.

In 2016, he played Ray, a menacing Texan, in Tom Ford's thriller Nocturnal Animals. For the role, he won the Golden Globe Award for Best Supporting Actor – Motion Picture. Taylor-Johnson also became first Golden Globe Award for Best Supporting Actor winner since Richard Benjamin who did not receive an Academy Award nomination. For the role he also received a nomination for the BAFTA Award for Best Actor in a Supporting Role. In 2017, he played an American soldier (alongside John Cena) in Doug Liman's thriller The Wall, and in 2018, he appeared in Outlaw King, a British-American historical action drama about Robert the Bruce and the Wars of Scottish Independence. 

In 2020, Taylor-Johnson had a supporting role in Christopher Nolan's Tenet. In 2022, he appeared in David Leitch's Bullet Train, an action-thriller film based on the novel Mariabītoru by Kōtarō Isaka. 

Taylor-Johnson will next play another Marvel character in Kraven the Hunter, set to be released in 2023 as part of the Sony's Spider-Man Universe. He will also reunite with Leitch in the action film The Fall Guy, and star in Robert Eggers horror film Nosferatu.

Personal life
After Johnson met filmmaker Sam Taylor-Wood in 2009 on the set of their film Nowhere Boy, when he was 18 and she was 42, the two began dating and were married in the chapel at Babington House on 21 June 2012. They subsequently changed their surnames to Taylor-Johnson. They have two daughters, while he is the stepfather of her two daughters from a previous marriage.

Taylor-Johnson was named one of GQs 50 best dressed British men in 2015.

Filmography

Film
{| class="wikitable sortable"
|-
! Year
! Title
! Role
! Director
! class="unsortable" | Notes
|-
| 2000
| The Apocalypse
| Johanan
| Raffaele Mertes
|
|-
| 2002
| Tom & Thomas
| Tom Sheppard / Thomas
| Esmé Lammers
|
|-
| rowspan="2" | 2003
| Behind Closed Doors
| Sam Goodwin
| Louis Caulfield
|
|-
| Shanghai Knights
| Charlie Chaplin
| David Dobkin
|
|-
| 2004
| Dead Cool
| George
| David Cohen
|
|-
| rowspan="4" | 2006
| 
| Prosper
| Richard Claus
|
|-
| 
| Young Eisenheim
| Neil Burger
|
|-
| Fast Learners
| Neil
| Christoph Röhl
| Short film
|-
| 
| Michael (Aged 15)
| Stefan Schwartz
|
|-
| 2007
| The Magic Door
| "Flip"
| Paul Matthews
|
|-
| rowspan="2" | 2008
| Dummy
| Danny
| Matthew Thompson
|
|-
| Angus, Thongs and Perfect Snogging
| Robbie Jennings
| Gurinder Chadha
|
|-
| rowspan="2" | 2009
| 
| Bennett Brewer
| Shana Feste
|
|-
| Nowhere Boy
| John Lennon
| Sam Taylor-Johnson
|
|-
| rowspan="2" | 2010
| Kick-Ass
| Dave Lizewski / Kick-Ass
| Matthew Vaughn
|
|-
| Chatroom
| William Collins
| Hideo Nakata
|
|-
| 2011
| Albert Nobbs
| Joe Mackins
| Rodrigo García
|
|-
| rowspan="2" | 2012
| Savages
| Ben Leonard
| Oliver Stone
|
|-
| Anna Karenina
| Count Alexei Kirillovich Vronsky
| Joe Wright
| Final credit as Aaron Johnson
|-
| 2013
| Kick-Ass 2
| Dave Lizewski / Kick-Ass
| Jeff Wadlow
| First credit as Aaron Taylor-Johnson
|-
| rowspan="2" | 2014
| Captain America: The Winter Soldier
| Pietro Maximoff
| Anthony and Joe Russo
| Uncredited cameo; mid-credits scene
|-
| Godzilla
| Lieutenant Ford Brody
| Gareth Edwards
|
|-
| 2015
| Avengers: Age of Ultron
| Pietro Maximoff
| Joss Whedon
|
|-
| 2016
| Nocturnal Animals
| Ray Marcus
| Tom Ford
|
|-
| 2017
| The Wall
| Sergeant Allen "Ize" Isaac
| Doug Liman
|
|-
| rowspan="2" | 2018
| Outlaw King
| James Douglas, Lord of Douglas
| David Mackenzie
|
|-
| A Million Little Pieces
| James Frey
| Sam Taylor-Johnson
| Also writer and producer
|-
| 2020
| Tenet
| Ives
| Christopher Nolan
|
|-
| 2021
| The King's Man
| Archie Reid
| Matthew Vaughn
|
|-
| 2022
| Bullet Train
| Tangerine
| David Leitch
|
|-
| 2023
| Kraven the Hunter
| Sergei Kravinoff / Kraven the Hunter
| J. C. Chandor
| Post-production
|-
| 2024
| The Fall Guy
|
| David Leitch
| Filming
|-
| TBA
| Nosferatu
| Friedrich Harding
| Robert Eggers
| Filming
|}

Television

Video games

Awards and nominations

References

External links

 

1990 births
Living people
20th-century English male actors
21st-century English male actors
Best Supporting Actor Golden Globe (film) winners
English expatriates in the United States
English male child actors
English male film actors
English male television actors
People from High Wycombe
British people of Jewish descent
English people of Jewish descent